Davis Mwale (born May 8, 1972) is a boxer from Zambia.

He participated in the 2004 Summer Olympics for his native African country. There he was stopped in the second round of the Light welterweight (64 kg) division by Cuba's eventual runner-up Yudel Johnson Cedeno.

Mwale won the bronze medal in the same division one year earlier, at the All-Africa Games in Abuja, Nigeria.

References

1972 births
Living people
Light-welterweight boxers
Welterweight boxers
Boxers at the 1996 Summer Olympics
Boxers at the 2004 Summer Olympics
Olympic boxers of Zambia
Boxers at the 1994 Commonwealth Games
Boxers at the 1998 Commonwealth Games
Boxers at the 2002 Commonwealth Games
Commonwealth Games bronze medallists for Zambia
Zambian male boxers
Commonwealth Games medallists in boxing
African Games bronze medalists for Zambia
African Games medalists in boxing
Competitors at the 2003 All-Africa Games
Competitors at the 1999 All-Africa Games
Medallists at the 1998 Commonwealth Games
Medallists at the 2002 Commonwealth Games